William Milo Stone (October 14, 1827 – July 18, 1893) was the sixth Governor of Iowa (1864–68).

Early life and education 
Stone was born in Jefferson County, New York, and moved with his family to Coshocton, Ohio in 1834. He read law there and was admitted to the bar in 1851.

Career 
In 1854, he moved to Knoxville, Iowa, where he opened a law practice and bought the local newspaper. In 1856, he was a delegate to the convention that formed the Republican Party, and he was an elector for 1856 Republican presidential nominee John C. Frémont. He was an enthusiastic supporter of Abraham Lincoln at the 1860 Republican convention, and was so again in 1864. From 1857 to 1861, he served as a state district court judge. He married Caroline Mathews in 1857; they had one child, William A. Stone.

After the attack on Fort Sumter in 1861, Stone enlisted as a private in the Union Army. He was quickly promoted to captain, and then major, of Company B, 3rd Iowa Volunteer Infantry Regiment. He fought and was wounded at the Battle of Liberty, but returned to fight at the Battle of Shiloh, where he was taken prisoner. Stone was paroled by Jefferson Davis and sent to Washington, D.C. to negotiate an exchange of prisoners; after initially failing to reach an agreement, he returned to Confederate captivity, was again paroled, and was released after an exchange agreement was reached. In 1862, Stone was promoted to colonel of the 22nd Iowa Volunteer Infantry Regiment. He led that unit in the Vicksburg Campaign, and was again wounded on May 22, 1863, during a major Union assault undertaken as part of the Siege of Vicksburg.

Stone was named the Republican nominee for governor in June 1863, and resigned from the Union Army in August. He was elected by a large margin in the general election, defeating Union general James M. Tuttle. He was reelected in 1865. During his tenure, he dealt with several difficult issues, including making sure Iowa met its 1864 draft quotas, and supporting voting rights for black Iowa citizens. It is reputed by some sources that Stone was present in April 1865 when Lincoln was assassinated at Ford's Theatre, and that Stone helped carry the wounded Lincoln across the street. However, no known primary or contemporaneous accounts describe that happening, and in fact, it is otherwise known that four members of a Pennsylvania artillery regiment actually handled the President. On February 22, 1866, Stone appointed Emily Calkins Stebbins as a notary public which made Stebbins the first such woman to hold that position in the United States.

After leaving the governor's office in 1868, Stone served one term in the Iowa House of Representatives (1877–78), and was appointed Assistant Commissioner and Commissioner of the General Land Office.

Death 
He died of pneumonia in 1893 in Oklahoma, where he had moved to practice law and live with his son. He is buried at Graceland Cemetery in Knoxville, Iowa.

References

External links 
   Portrait and Biographical Album, Muscatine County, Iowa, 1889, page 131
  History of Iowa From the Earliest Times To The Beginning of the Twentieth Century, Volume IV, 1903
  The 22nd Iowa Infantry

1827 births
1893 deaths
People associated with the assassination of Abraham Lincoln
Republican Party governors of Iowa
Deaths from pneumonia in Oklahoma
Iowa state court judges
Republican Party members of the Iowa House of Representatives
Union Army colonels
People of Iowa in the American Civil War
People from Jefferson County, New York
People from Knoxville, Iowa
Union Army officers
General Land Office Commissioners
People from Coshocton, Ohio
Union (American Civil War) state governors
American lawyers admitted to the practice of law by reading law
19th-century American judges
19th-century American politicians